Eduardo Delgado Rodriguez was a Cuban brigadier general and chief of the Intelligence Directorate in Cuba. He went by the code name MX within the espionage agency's hierarchy, whose ranks go from MI to MX.

Career

Intelligence Directorate activities
Involved in a number of foreign intelligence activities, Rodriguez was the alleged overseer of a 1996 incident where four Brothers to the Rescue pilots were killed after being shot down by Cuban Mikoyan planes. The involvement of the Intelligence Directorate was revealed by Stuart Hoyt Jr., a retired FBI agent, during the trial of five individuals accused of spying for Cuba. Rodriguez was also the chief investigator in the trial and eventual execution of Arnaldo Ochoa for treason and drug trafficking in 1989. Rodriguez was quoted as saying in a news conference in 1991 that he and intelligence agents had stopped a "U.S.-backed attempt to create an opposition group on the island" started by exiles and dissidents in Spain and Cuba, respectively.

References

Date of birth missing (living people)
Living people
Cuban military personnel
Cuban spies
Year of birth missing (living people)